Anne-Louise Lambert (born 21 August 1955) (also credited as Anne Lambert) is an Australian actress. She is best known for her role as Miranda in the 1975 film Picnic at Hanging Rock.

Life and career
Born Anne Louise Lambert in Brisbane, Australia she later moved to Sydney. Under the name Anne Lambert, she first gained recognition on Australian television with roles in three soap operas. In 1973, she played nymphomaniac Sue Marshall in Number 96. The following year, she was an original cast member in a school-based drama, Class of '74, playing student Peggy Richardson.

Director Peter Weir saw her in a television commercial for Fanta playing the fancy Nancy character and felt she was perfect for the lead role in Picnic at Hanging Rock. In 1976, she had a six-month role in adult soap opera The Box as the "sexy and promiscuous" Trish Freeman.

During 1975, she appeared in a recurring sketch in comedy series The Norman Gunston Show called "The Checkout Chicks". This sketch, a send-up of melodramatic soap operas set in a supermarket, mostly featured other former Number 96 actors - Vivienne Garrett, Candy Raymond, Philippa Baker, Judy Lynne, and Abigail.

She adopted the name Anne-Louise Lambert when, on seeking work in the UK, she found that another actress was listed as Anne Lambert.  She has worked steadily in film and on stage ever since, including starring roles in the BBC TV series The Borgias (1981), Cousin Phillis (1982) Peter Greenaway's The Draughtsman's Contract (1982), Breathing Under Water (1991), Seeing Red (1992),  The Dirtwater Dynasty and Great Expectations – The Untold Story ,  A Los Cuatro Vientos (1987),filmed in Spain; and Australian TV miniseries such as Mussolini and I (1985), Fields of Fire 2 (1988), and Tanamera-The Lion of Singapore (1989).  Her stage roles include Sweet Bird of Youth co-starring with Lauren Bacall and Colin Friels. She also played the role of Lady Mary Brackenstall in the adaptation of "The Abbey Grange" for The Adventures of Sherlock Holmes (1986).

She later appeared in Lillian's Story with Toni Collette, and Somersault, which won Best Film at the 2004 Australian Film Institute Awards.  She also appeared in the Australian TV series The Alice (2004) and the short drama Photograph (2006), directed by her sister Sarah Lambert, and also the short film Waiting for the Turning of the Earth(2011). Her most recent movie is The Last Babushka Doll (2018).

Lambert resides in the Sydney suburb of Balmain with her son Harry (born 1989) and works as a psychotherapist, counsellor, and coach.

Filmography

FILM

TELEVISION

External links 
 
MIRANDA REVISITED: PORTRAIT OF ANNE LOUISE LAMBERT AT HANGING ROCK

References

1955 births
Actresses from Brisbane
Australian television actresses
Living people
20th-century Australian actresses
21st-century Australian actresses